Acts 15 is the fifteenth chapter of the Acts of the Apostles in the New Testament of the Christian Bible. It records Paul and Barnabas traveling to Jerusalem to attend the Council of Jerusalem and the beginning of Paul's second missionary journey. The book containing this chapter is anonymous but early Christian tradition uniformly affirmed that Luke composed this book as well as the Gospel of Luke.

Text
The original text was written in Koine Greek. This chapter is divided into 41 verses.

Textual witnesses
Some early manuscripts containing the text of this chapter are:
In Greek
 Codex Vaticanus (AD 325–350)
 Codex Sinaiticus (330–360)
 Codex Bezae (c. 400)
 Codex Alexandrinus (400–440)
 Codex Ephraemi Rescriptus (c. 450)
 Papyrus 127 (5th century; extant verses 29–30, 34–41)
 Codex Laudianus (c. 550; complete)
 Papyrus 33 (c. 550)
In Latin
 Codex Laudianus (~550; complete)
León palimpsest (7th century; complete)

Locations
{{Location map+
| Mediterranean
| width=500
| float=right
| label= Central and eastern Mediterranean Sea
| caption= Places mentioned in (blue) and related to (black) this chapter.
| relief = yes
| places= {{Location map~| Mediterranean
|lat= 43.0 |long= 12
     |mark= Blue_pog.svg
     |marksize=0
     |label= Italy 
     |background=
     |label_size= 80
     |position= top
    }}
}}
This chapter mentions the following places (in order of appearance):
 Judea
 Phoenicia
 Samaria
 Jerusalem
 Antioch, Syria
 Pamphylia
 Cyprus
 Cilicia

 Timeline 
The journey of Paul and Barnabas to Jerusalem and the Council of Jerusalem is generally considered to have taken place around 48  – 50 AD.

Conflict over circumcision (15:1–5)

The circumcision controversy began in Antioch, when 'certain men' (certain 'people' in the NIV translation) came from Judea teaching that salvation was dependent on circumcision according to the Mosaic law. The People's New Testament Commentary  called them 'the Judaizing Teachers'; Paul called them and others with the same teaching 'false brethren secretly brought in'.

The dispute which arose resulted in a decision to send Paul and Barnabas to Jerusalem, to seek a resolution to the issue. In Jerusalem the pro-circumcision case was argued by 'some of the sect of the Pharisees who believed'.

Council of Jerusalem (15:6–29)

The account of Jerusalem Council is bracketed by the scenes in Antioch (verses 1–5 opening; verses 30–35 closing) as an indication that the narrator shifted from Jerusalem to Antioch as 'home ground', and might not have access to the developments in Jerusalem since Peter left that city in Acts 12:17.

Verse 13
 And after they had become silent, James answered, saying, "Men and brethren, listen to me:"The council listened to James because he was the first of the three pillars of church (see Galatians 2:9). He was the leader of the church in Jerusalem until he was stoned to death at the insistence of the high priest in 62 AD. James was the Lord Jesus Christ's half brother, the one who did not believe until the Lord appeared to him privately after the Resurrection (see 1 Corinthians 15:7).

Verse 14Simon has declared how God first visited the Gentiles to take from among them a people for His name. 
"Simon" here from Greek text , '', which is used for Simon Peter only here and in 2 Peter 1:1.

Return to Antioch (15:30–35)
Armed with the apostolic decree, Paul and Barnabas triumphantly returned to Antioch, accompanied by the Jerusalem delegates, Judas (surnamed Barsabbas) and Silas (verses 22, 32), who provided
encouragement and strengthening (cf. ), just like Barnabas, who was originally sent from Jerusalem to Antioch.

Paul and Barnabas part company (15:36–41)
This section opens the account of Paul's second journey which started after an unspecified interval (verse 36), without the formal commissioning ceremony as in the first one  and was simply aimed to revisit converts from the previous mission (verse 36). Paul parted ways with Barnabas before the departure (verses 37–39), and Barnabas disappears from the remaining chapters of Acts, although Paul mentions him in his first epistle to the Corinthians. Silas of Jerusalem (also called "Silvanus" in Latinized form), who is a 'prophet' and anointed by the Holy Spirit (like Paul and Barnabas), became Paul's new companion (verse 40). Paul and Silas began the journey through the Taurus Mountains passing Paul's home territory of Cilicia (verse 41), following the route along southern Anatolia (now Turkey) across the Cilician Gates. Later, they evangelized Macedonia and Achaea (1 Thessalonians 1:1).

See also

 Related Bible parts: Acts 14, 1 Corinthians 15, Galatians 2

References

Sources

External links
 King James Bible - Wikisource
English Translation with Parallel Latin Vulgate
Online Bible at GospelHall.org (ESV, KJV, Darby, American Standard Version, Bible in Basic English)
Multiple bible versions at Bible Gateway (NKJV, NIV, NRSV etc.)

15
James, brother of Jesus